Wellington and Bligh was an electoral district of the Legislative Assembly in the Australian state of New South Wales, named after Wellington County and Bligh County, and including Mudgee. There were also separate electoral districts of Wellington (County), covering part of Wellington County, and Phillip, Brisbane and Bligh, including part of Bligh County. In 1859, it was largely replaced by Mudgee.

Members for Wellington and Bligh

Election results

1856

1858

References

Wellington and Bligh
1856 establishments in Australia
1859 disestablishments in Australia